Bilice is a populated place in the Kotor Varoš Municipality of Central Bosnia, Bosnia and Herzegovina.

Population

See also
Kotor Varoš

References 

Villages in Republika Srpska
Populated places in Kotor Varoš